Leif Solberg (18 November 1914 – 25 January 2016) was a Norwegian classical composer and organist.

He was born in Lena, Norway. After studying at the Norwegian Academy of Music he spent his professional career as the organist in Lillehammer from 1938 to 1982. He was also a music tutor and choral conductor. However he is better known as a classical composer. He became a centenarian in 2014, and died in 2016, aged 101.

Solberg's works include:

Organ works:
Preludium og fuge i c moll, 1933
Variasjoner over folketonen “Eg veit i himmerik ei borg”, 1933
Fantasi og fuge over folketonen “Se solens skjønne lys og prakt”, 1936
Koralfantasi over “Av dypest nød jeg rope må”, 1937
Preludium, passacaglia og fuge over folketonen “Gå varsomt min sjel”, 1940
Variasjoner over “Mitt hjerte alltid vanker”, 1945
Ciaconna i g moll, 1953

Other works:
Maihaug-cantata, 1941/42
Langfredagsmeditasjon, 1948
String Quartet, 1945
Violin Sonata, 1948
Symphony in G minor, 1951/52

References

1914 births
2016 deaths
Norwegian centenarians
Norwegian classical composers
Norwegian classical organists
Male classical organists
Norwegian choral conductors
Male conductors (music)
People from Østre Toten
Norwegian male classical composers
Men centenarians